Epsilon Trianguli, Latinized from ε Trianguli, is a binary star system in the northern constellation of Triangulum. Based upon measurement of its trigonometric parallax, it is approximately 390 light years from Earth.

The primary component is an A-type main sequence star with a stellar classification of A2 V, an apparent magnitude of +5.50 and an estimated age of 600 million years. It has 2.75 times the mass of the Sun and is spinning with a projected rotational velocity of 107 km/s. The radius of this star is more than three times the radius of the Sun, and the photosphere has an effective temperature of about 10,000. The secondary component has an apparent magnitude of 11.4 and is separated from the primary by an angle of 3.9 arcseconds.

An excess emission of infrared radiation suggests the presence of a dusty disk in orbit about the primary. This disk has a mean radius of 105 AU, or 105 times the separation of the Earth from the Sun, and is radiating at a temperature of 85 K.

This star system is a probable member of the Ursa Major Moving Group of stars that share a common motion through space. The space velocity components of Epsilon Trianguli are  = .

References

A-type main-sequence stars
Binary stars
Ursa Major Moving Group

Trianguli, Epsilon
Triangulum (constellation)
Durchmusterung objects
Trianguli, 03
012471
009570
0599